The Dent du Vélan is a peak in the Chablais Alps, located north of the Cornettes de Bise. The Dent du Vélan is the westernmost summit rising above  in Switzerland.

References

Mountains of the Alps
Mountains of Haute-Savoie
Mountains of Valais
Mountains of Switzerland